Ukuz (Aghul: Уккуд) is a rural locality (a selo) in Usugsky Selsoviet, Kurakhsky District, Republic of Dagestan, Russia. The population was 36 as of 2010. There are 2 streets.

Geography 
Ukuz is located 27 km northwest of Kurakh (the district's administrative centre) by road. Usug and Gelkhen are the nearest rural localities.

Nationalities 
Aghul people live there.

References 

Rural localities in Kurakhsky District